Alotanypus is a genus of non-biting midges of the bloodworm family Chironomidae.

Species
A. antarcticus (Hudson, 1892)
A. aris Roback, 1971
A. dalyupensis (Freeman, 1961)
A. kuroberobustus (Sasa & Okazawa, 1992)
A. oliveirai (Roque & Trivinho-Strixino, 2003)
A. umbrosus (Freeman, 1959)
A. venustus (Coquillett, 1902)
A. vittigera (Edwards, 1931)
A. wilhelmensis Silva, 2016

References

Chironomidae